The 8th Toronto International Film Festival (TIFF) took place in Toronto, Ontario, Canada between September 9 and September 17, 1983. This year, the festival introduced Contemporary World Cinema programme. The festival also shone light on Paul Verhoeven's work. The festival also held a retrospective in honor of David Cronenberg, first time for a Toronto-reared director. The censor board insisted that the censored version of Cronenberg's film The Brood, approved in 1979 be used.

The Big Chill by Lawrence Kasdan was selected as the opening film. It won the People's Choice Award at the festival, and later got nominated for Academy Awards, BAFTAs and the Golden Globes.

Awards

Programme

Gala Presentations
The Big Chill by Lawrence Kasdan
Carmen by Prosper Mérimée
Educating Rita by Lewis Gilbert
Entre Nous by Diane Kurys
Heart Like a Wheel by Jonathan Kaplan
Merry Christmas, Mr. Lawrence by Nagisa Ōshima
Moon in the Gutter by Jean-Jacques Beineix
Streamers by Robert Altman
The Tin Flute (Bonheur d'occasion) by Claude Fournier
Vertigo (1983 reissue) by Alfred Hitchcock

Contemporary World Cinema
Alsino and the Condor by Miguel Littín
Angelo My Love by Robert Duvall
L'Argent by Robert Bresson
Au clair de la lune by André Forcier
La Balance by Bob Swaim
The Ballad of Narayama by Shōhei Imamura
Bella Donna by Peter Keglevic
Beyond Forty (La Quarantaine) by Anne Claire Poirier
Can She Bake a Cherry Pie? by Henry Jaglom
Danton by Andrzej Wajda
Le Dernier Combat by Luc Besson
Deserters by Jack Darcus
Enormous Changes at the Last Minute by Mirra Bank, Ellen Hovde and Muffie Meyer
Eréndira by Ruy Guerra
Experience Preferred... But Not Essential by Peter Duffell
The Eyes, the Mouth by Marco Bellocchio
Fists in the Pocket by Marco Bellocchio
The Fourth Man by Paul Verhoeven
The Go Masters by Junya Sato and Jishun Duan
The Leopard by Luchino Visconti
My Brother's Wedding by Charles Burnett
The South by Víctor Erice
The State of Things by Wim Wenders
Strangers Kiss by Matthew Chapman

Documentaries
Comfort and Indifference (Le confort et l'indifférence) by Denys Arcand
Falasha: Exile of the Black Jews by Simcha Jacobovici
In the Year of the Snake
Return Engagement by Alan Rudolph
The Shimmering Beast (La bête lumineuse) by Pierre Perrault
To the Rhythm of My Heart (Au rythme de mon cœur) by Jean Pierre Lefebvre
We're Not the Jet Set by Robert Duvall

David Cronenberg retrospective
 Stereo (1969)
 Crimes of the Future (1970)
 Shivers (1975)
 Rabid (1977)
 Fast Company (1979)
 The Brood (1979)
 Scanners (1981)
 Videodrome (1983)

References

External links
 Official site
 TIFF: A Reel History: 1976 - 2012
1983 Toronto International Film Festival at IMDb

1983
1983 film festivals
1983 in Toronto
1983 in Canadian cinema